The memorial temple of Ramesses III at Medinet Habu contains a minor list of pharaohs of the New Kingdom of Egypt. The inscriptions closely resemble the Ramesseum king list, which is a similar scene of Ramesses II, which was used as a template for the scenes here.

The scene shows Ramesses III participating in the ceremonies of the Festival of Min where statues of ancestral kings are carried in an elaborate procession to make offerings to Min. It contains 16 cartouches with the names of nine pharaohs divided into two parts.

The sparse outline of the scene was published by Vivant Denon in 1802, who was part of Napoleon's expedition to Egypt in 1798 to 1801, which published a slightly more detailed scene in 1809.
Thirty years later, the complete scene including the cartouches of the kings was published by John Gardner Wilkinson in 1837, followed by Champollion and Lepsius. All the 19th-century editions contain omissions and errors, but in 1940 the Epigraphic Survey published the definitive (and complete) rendering of the scenes.

The kings mentioned in the list 
The scene is divided in two parts, on the left side, 7 statues of ancestors are being carried in a procession. The right side is led by nine kings.

It remains in situ on the eastern second pylon in the second court, in the upper register on the eastern wall.

References

Bibliography 
 Dominique Vivant Denon: Voyage dans la Basse et la Haute Égypte, pendant les campagnes du général Bonaparte, plate 134 (Paris: 1802)
 Description de l'Égypte, ou, Recueil des observations et des recherches qui ont été faites en Égypte pendant l'expédition de l'armée française, Vol. II, Planches: Antiquités. Plate 11. (Paris: Imprimerie impériale, 1809)
 John Gardner Wilkinson: Manners and customs of the ancient Egyptians, including their private life, government, laws, art, manufactures, religions, and early history, plate 76, (London: 1837)
 Jean François Champollion:  Monuments de l'Égypte et de la Nubie, Vol. III, plates 213-214 (Paris: 1845)
 Carl Richard Lepsius:  Denkmaeler aus Aegypten und Aethiopien, III, plates 212-213, (Berlin: 1849)
 The Epigraphic Survey: Medinet Habu: Volume IV, Festival Scenes of Ramses III, Oriental Institute Press 51, Plates 203-207 (Chicago: 1940)
 Kenneth A. Kitchen: Ramesside Inscriptions, Vol V, pp. 205:12-13; 209:11-12 (Oxford: 1983)

12th-century BC works
1802 archaeological discoveries
Ancient Egyptian King lists